Jamal Allen Sowell is a business executive in the state of Florida. He served as Florida's Secretary of Commerce, serving as the chief executive officer of Enterprise Florida, Inc. (EFI), the state's primary economic development agency under Governor Ron DeSantis. During the COVID-19 pandemic, Sowell assisted the Governor on keeping Florida businesses open during a national economic downturn. The DeSantis Administration called Sowell's efforts to support the state's pro-business policies, "indispensable" in making Florida "the beacon of opportunity for the entire country". After being one of the longest serving original cabinet members under DeSantis, Sowell resigned as Secretary of Commerce to attend military training for the United States Navy Reserve.

Early life and education
Jamal Sowell is a sixth generation Florida native born in Orlando, Florida to James and Lutricia Sowell. Sowell's parents met at Florida A&M University (FAMU) where his father was the class of 1968 Army ROTC distinguished military graduate. Sowell is a proud monthly donor to FAMU.

The Sowell family has a multi-generational tradition of military service. Sowell's grandfather fought in World War II, while his father served in Vietnam, and brother deployed to Iraq where he became disabled. Sowell's father was one of Florida's first 100 African-American attorneys.

Sowell's parents both hail from the rural Florida regions of Hamilton, Lake County and Jackson County. Sowell was raised in the Pine Hills neighborhood of Orlando, Florida. He attended Dr. Phillips High School before transferring to West Oaks Academy, a small Christian school. His Uncle is Commodores Founder Thomas McClary, and his cousin is Michigan Supreme Court Justice Kurtis Wilder.

Sowell attended the University of Florida, where he became Student Body President and a member of the University Board of Trustees. Sowell graduated with a Bachelor of Arts degree in religion in 2005, with a minor in Family, Youth and Community Sciences. He was awarded the UF Outstanding Male Leader Award, inducted into the UF Hall of Fame, and received the UF Outstanding Young Alumni Award. He sits on the UF Alumni Association Board of Directors. He did coursework in 19th century American literature under Professor Barry O'Connell at Amherst College, while he worked at Amherst College, and the University of Massachusetts Amherst. He has also worked at Texas A&M University in College Station, Texas.

Sowell earned a Master's of Higher Education Administration & Policy from the University of Massachusetts Amherst and a Juris Doctor and a certificate in constitutional design from Indiana University Bloomington Maurer School of Law. At Indiana University Bloomington, Sowell was a Pat Tillman Scholar.  He also served on the editorial board for the Indiana Journal of Constitutional Design and was an associate with the Indiana Center for Constitutional Democracy. While pursuing his degree in law, Sowell worked for Congressman Todd Young. He lived in Israel and worked for Shurat HaDin, a non-governmental organization in Israel dedicated to fighting terrorist organizations through legal action. Sowell was selected by The Federalist Society to be an editor for the Harvard Journal of Law and Public Policy Symposium. Sowell was also appointed to a state board regulating health facility administrators by Indiana Governor Mike Pence.

Military service 
While in graduate school, Sowell enlisted in the United States Marine Corps Reserve as a Private First Class. After completing graduate school, he went to active duty and was commissioned as an Officer. He served in Operation Enduring Freedom in 2010 during one of the deadliest years for troops in Afghanistan. Sowell continues to serve his nation as an officer in the United States Navy Reserve.

Career 
Jamal Sowell was selected by Governor Ron DeSantis of Florida to serve as the state's Secretary of Commerce and CEO of Enterprise Florida, Inc. (EFI) the state's principal economic development organization at the outset of the Governor's administration. Enterprise Florida is a public private partnership which coupled Florida's department of commerce with a private sector Board of Directors to direct economic development efforts throughout the state. EFI works with the state's economic development associations, economic development partners and private sector businesses to recruit new employers to the state while creating new business opportunities abroad for Florida-based businesses. Sowell oversaw the entities 3 statewide offices and 14 international offices. When Sowell left the role, Florida had 16 consecutive months of job growth after the height of shutdowns at the start of the pandemic. Enterprise Florida led the relocation or expansion of companies like Dun & Bradstreet, The Boeing Company, Citigroup, Pfizer, The Blackstone Group, Goldman-Sachs, Ark Invest, and many more in the Sunshine State. In his resignation letter he told the Governor, "What you did was very simple but very different from other states: you let the world know that we were open and ready for business," Sowell said. "That alone, drew remarkable interest in Florida and Florida businesses, sparking a migration of hundreds of thousands of new residents here."

During Sowell's tenure, the organization organized the largest trade mission to Israel in the state's history on behalf of the Governor. The goal of the mission was to strengthen ties between Florida and the State of Israel. This trip solidified future trade ties with Israel as it was the first time a governor from any U.S. state, visited both the University of Ariel and the region of Gush Etzion. While in Israel, the governor visited Yad Vashem, the World Holocaust Remembrance Center. He also signed an anti-Semitism bill passed unanimously by the Florida House and Senate. Governor DeSantis participated in round tables and discussions with Israeli experts addressing a broad range of issues from water and agricultural technology, medical and environmental research, tourism, cultural and educational exchanges, to school safety and security. The Florida delegation met with Prime Minister Benjamin Netanyahu, and two Israeli Cabinet members, the Minister of Science, Ofir Akunis, and the Minister of Strategic Affairs, Gilad Erdan, to discuss ways to strengthen relations between Florida and Israel in a variety of areas including space technologies, cybersecurity, emergency management, increasing trade, and investments. They also met with executives from EL AL airlines, which laid the groundwork for EL AL flights to Orlando and the eventual relocation of the EL AL headquarters from New York to Miami. This mission was a natural continuation for Sowell because of his time working in Israel and experience in college advocating for the U.S.-Israel relationship.

Sowell led Enterprise Florida, Inc. (EFI) throughout the COVID-19 pandemic. He assisted the Governor in leading EFI through the national recession as DeSantis led Florida's remarkable economic recovery by serving on the Governor's "Re-Open Florida Task Force" executive committee. The Governor lauded Sowell's leadership of Enterprise Florida, stating "I want to thank EFI for keeping Florida top of mind for investors and job creators, assisting existing Florida companies expand globally and maintaining programs that help all Florida businesses succeed".

Prior to joining the DeSantis Administration, Sowell was selected by Port Tampa Bay President and CEO Paul Anderson as the served as Chief of Staff for Port Tampa Bay. Port Tampa Bay is Florida's largest port by acreage and a key economic engine in the Tampa Bay region, generating $17.2 billion of total economic value. During his time in Tampa Bay, Sowell was appointed by the Pinellas County Commission to the Pinellas County Economic Development Council to help develop programs for economic development and trade opportunities for the Tampa Bay community. During this time, Governor-elect Ron DeSantis selected Sowell to be on the transition advisory committee on the economy composed of Florida's most recognized experts to help the Governor-elect shape the future of Florida's economy.

Sowell previously served as the special assistant to University of Florida President Dr. Bernie Machen, where he was a member of the president's cabinet and served as assistant corporate secretary for the university.

Personal life 
Jamal lives with his wife, a teacher who is a graduate of Alcorn State University and Florida A&M University.

References

Living people
United States Marine Corps personnel of the War in Afghanistan (2001–2021)
University of Florida College of Liberal Arts and Sciences alumni
University of Massachusetts Amherst College of Education alumni
Indiana University Maurer School of Law alumni
American chief executives
People from Orlando, Florida
United States Marine Corps officers
United States Navy reservists
State cabinet secretaries of Florida
Year of birth missing (living people)